Faiza Iftikhar is a Pakistani writer, author, novelist and screenwriter. She is active in the Pakistani television industry and known for her romantic and social plays. Her popular plays include Dil Lagi, Aunn Zara, Ranjha Ranjha Kardi etc. Her writing for Ranjha Ranjha Kardi earned her Lux Style Award of Best TV Writer. Her recent projects are Bandhay Aik Dor Say, Pehli Si Muhabbat and Prem Gali. Furthermore, she wrote the screenplay of Lollywood movie Tich Button.

Education and background 
Iftikhar has a masters' in political science and sociology. She has a son and two daughters and currently resides in Lahore. She revealed in an interview that Altaf Fatima, Urdu novelist and short story writer, encouraged her to write when she was her student.

Notable work

Novels
Hissar-e-Mohabbat
Ghar Aangan
Mera Tera Khali Kamra Hoon
Phulaan De Rang Kalay
Saray Gulab Le Jana
Roag

Drama serials
 Chudhvin Ka Chand
 Mannchalay
 Tum Jo Miley
 Tujh Pe Qurban
 Diya Jalay
 Shehr e Dil Ke Darwazay
 Zindagi Dhoop Tum Ghana Saya
 Roag
 Akbari Asghari
 Mohabbat Rooth Jaye Toh
 Bilqees Kaur
 Yahan Pyar Nahin Hai
 Thakan
 Piya Ka Ghar Pyara Lagay
 Aik Nayee Cinderella
 Khailoon Pyaar Ki Baazi
 Khoya Khoya Chand
 Meri Zindagi Hai Tu
 Ghundi
 Uff Yeh Mohabbat
 Kahani Raima Aur Manahil Ki
 Aap ki Kaneez
 Tum Woh Nahi
 Kaanch Ki Guriya
 Dil Lagi
 Mein Sitara
 Kathputli
 Aap Ke Liye
 Dil Banjaara
 Sakeena
 Mubarak Ho Beti Hui Hai
 Shayad
 Pinjra
 Woh Mera Dil Tha
 Aangan
 Baba Jani
 Ranjha Ranjha Kardi
 Bandhay Aik Dor Say
 Prem Gali
 Pehli Si Muhabbat
 Aik Thi Laila

Telefilms 
 Sudha Ki Katha
 Pyar Ki Love Story
 Rok Sako To Rok Lo
 Apni Apni Love Story
 Khana Khud Garam Karo

Films 
 Tich Button

Accolades 
 Hum Award for Best Writer Drama Serial for Bilqees Kaur – Nominated
 Hum Award for Best Writer Drama Serial for Yahan Pyar Nahin Hai – Nominated
 PISA Awards of Best TV Writer for Ranjha Ranjha Kardi – Nominated

Lux Style Awards

References

External links

Living people
Lollywood
Mass media in Lahore
Pakistani screenwriters
Pakistani women writers
Punjabi people
Urdu-language writers
Urdu-language writers from Pakistan
Year of birth missing (living people)
21st century in Pakistani television
21st-century Pakistani writers